The Haight Ashbury Free Clinics, Inc. is a free health care service provider serving more than 34,000 people in Northern California.

Overview
The organization was founded by Dr. David E. Smith in Haight-Ashbury, San Francisco, California on June 7, 1967, during the counterculture of the 1960s.  As thousands of youth arrived in the city, many were in need of substance abuse treatment, mental health service, and medical attention. The clinic became the model for the modern form of the free clinic. The Clinics are currently composed of four core programs:
 Medical clinics
 Substance abuse treatment services
 Jail psychiatric services
 Rock medicine: on-site medical services for public events and concerts
 Treasure Island Job Corp Wellness Center
The clinics merged in 2011 with Walden House an addiction treatment organization; in 2012 they adopted a new name: HealthRIGHT 360.

See also
Berkeley Free Clinic

References

 How a 'Hippie Clinic' in the Haight-Ashbury Started a Medical Revolution. Carrie Feibel. The California Report.  Aug 11, 2017.  KQED

Further reading

External links
Haight Ashbury Free Clinics - HealthRIGHT 360
Haight Ashbury Free Clinics website 2007 40th anniversary archive

Clinics in California
Haight-Ashbury, San Francisco
Healthcare in San Francisco
Addiction organizations in the United States
Hippie movement
Organizations based in San Francisco
Organizations established in 1967
1967 establishments in California
Mental health organizations in California